Granada Cathedral, or the Cathedral of the Incarnation is a Roman Catholic church in the city of Granada, capital of the province of the same name in the Autonomous Region of Andalusia, Spain. The cathedral is the seat of the Archdiocese of Granada. Like many other cathedrals in Andalusia, it was built on top of the city's main mosque after the reconquest of Granada.

History
  
  
Unlike most cathedrals in Spain, construction was not begun until the sixteenth century in 1518 in the centre of the old Muslim Medina, after acquisition of the Nasrid kingdom of Granada from its Muslim rulers in 1492. While its earliest plans had Gothic designs, such as are evident in the Royal Chapel of Granada by Enrique Egas, most of the church's construction occurred when the Spanish Renaissance style was supplanting the Gothic in Spanish architecture. Foundations for the church were laid by the Enrique Egas starting from 1518 to 1523 atop the site of the city's main mosque; by 1529, Egas was replaced by Diego de Siloé who worked for nearly four decades on the structure from ground to cornice, planning the triforium and five naves instead of the usual three. Most unusually, he created a circular capilla mayor (principal chapel) rather than a semicircular apse, perhaps inspired by Italian ideas for circular 'perfect buildings' (e.g., in Alberti's works). Within its structure the cathedral combines other of the Vitruvian orders of architecture.

Subsequent architects included Juan de Maena (1563–1571), followed by Juan de Orea (1571–1590), and Ambrosio de Vico (1590–?). In 1667 Alonso Cano, working with Gaspar de la Peña, altered the initial plan for the main façade, introducing Baroque elements. The cathedral took 181 years to build. It would have been even grander had the two 81-meter towers included in the plans been built; however, the project remained incomplete for various reasons, among them financial.

The cathedral had been intended as the royal mausoleum by Charles I of Spain, but Philip II of Spain moved the site for his father's and subsequent kings' tombs to El Escorial outside of Madrid.

The main chapel contains two kneeling effigies of the Catholic King and Queen, Isabel and Ferdinand by Pedro de Mena y Medrano. The busts of Adam and Eve were made by Alonso Cano. The Chapel of the Trinity has a marvelous retablo with paintings by El Greco, Jusepe de Ribera and Alonso Cano.

Features
Granada's cathedral has a rectangular base due to its five naves that completely cover the cross. All of the five naves are staggered in height, the central one being the largest. At the foot of the cathedral there are two towers. The left one, called the tower of San Miguel, acts as a buttress which replaced the planned tower on that side.

The main chapel consists of a series of Corinthian columns on which capitals is the entablature and, over it, the vault, which houses a series of delicate stained glass windows.

The facade consists of a framed structure in the form of a triumphal arch with portals and canvas. It consists of three pillars crowned by semicircular arches supported on pilasters, similar to San Andrés de Mantua of Leon Battista Alberti. The pilasters don't have capitals but projections sculptured in the walls, as well as attached marble medallions. Above the main door is located a marble tondo from "José Laughing on the Annunciation". Additionally, there is a vase with lilies at the top, alluding to the virgin and pure nature of the mother of God.

The sacrarium, raised between 1706 and 1759, follows the classic proportions of the whole, keeping the multiple columns of the transept the shapes of the compound of Siloam.

References

External links

 Website of Granada Cathedral with relevant information
 Guide to monuments of Granada: the Cathedral 
 Information about Granada Cathedral on a website devoted monuments of Granada, Spain
 Del arte árabe en España A nook By Rafael Contreras y Muñoz dealing with Arabs and Spanish art and architecture, pages 1–7.
 Information on the Cathedrals of Granada on the Spain.info website.
 History of the monuments of Granada in English
 Detailed maps of Granada
 Guide to Granada Cathedral and the city of Granada

Roman Catholic churches completed in 1710
18th-century Roman Catholic church buildings in Spain
Granada
Renaissance architecture in Granada
Buildings and structures in Granada
Former mosques in Spain
Conversion of non-Christian religious buildings and structures into churches
Roman Catholic churches in Granada
1561 establishments in Spain
Church buildings with domes
Buildings converted to Catholic church buildings